Meylis Annaberdiyev (born November 24, 1985, Büzmeýin, Turkmenistan) is a chess Champion of Turkmenistan. He earned Chess Grandmaster title in 2022 1st FIDE Council.

Notable Tournaments

Notes

References 

Chess grandmasters
1985 births
Living people
Sportspeople from Ashgabat
Turkmenistan chess players
Chess players at the 2006 Asian Games